Paul Donald Bryer (born 21 June 1958) has been the Archdeacon of Cornwall in the Church of England since 2019.

Bryer was educated at Sussex University and ordained in 1990. His first post was a curacy in Tonbridge. He was the incumbent of Camberley then of Dorking before his appointment as archdeacon in 2013 following his predecessor's appointment to Bishop of Blackburn. Bryer became Archdeacon of Cornwall (in the Diocese of Truro) in 2019: he was collated 1 September 2019. He has also served as Acting Archdeacon of Bodmin since 1 March 2021.

References

1958 births
Alumni of the University of Sussex
Archdeacons of Dorking
Archdeacons of Cornwall
Living people